Lawrence White may refer to:

 Lawrence Grant White (1887–1956), American architect and critic
 Lawrence H. White (born 1954), economist
 Lawrence J. White (born c. 1943), economist
 Lawrence Kermit White (1912–2006), CIA officer
 40 Glocc (born 1969), stage name of American rapper called Lawrence White
 Larry White (born 1958), baseball player

Characters
 Lawrence White (Emmerdale), a character in the soap opera Emmerdale